Antonio Sacchi (died 1694) was an Italian painter of the Baroque period.

He was born in Como and studied in Rome, where he died in 1694.

References

17th-century Italian painters
Italian male painters
Italian Baroque painters
People from Como
1694 deaths
Year of birth unknown